Eastington is a hamlet and former civil parish, now in the parish of Northleach with Eastington, in the Cotswold district, in the English county of Gloucestershire, 1.5 miles from Northleach, near Cirencester. In 1931 the parish had a population of 334.

The manor of Eastington (or "Northleach Foreign") was held by St Peter's Abbey, Gloucester until the Reformation, then passed to the crown and subsequently the Dutton family.

Eastington Manor is a 15th-century hall house with later additions.

Governance 
Eastington was formerly a tything in Nothleach parish, from 1866 Eastington was a civil parish in its own right until it was abolished on 1 October 1950 to form "Northleach with Eastington".

References

 David Verey, Gloucestershire: the Cotswolds, The Buildings of England edited by Nikolaus Pevsner, 2nd ed. (1979) , p. 343

External links 

Hamlets in Gloucestershire
Former civil parishes in Gloucestershire
Cotswold District